Corazón de Jesús (Spanish: Isla Corazón de Jesús, Kuna Akuanasutupu) is an island in Kuna Yala territory, Panama, with an area of 1.5 hectares and a population of 600. It is connected to larger Narganá due west of it by a concrete bridge, and completely overbuilt. Both islands are among the most westernized of the San Blas Islands.

External links 

 Satellite Image

Caribbean islands of Panama